Robert D. "Rob" Strain is the former Director of NASA's Goddard Space Flight Center. Strain held that post from August 4, 2008, through March 5, 2012. Strain announced in January 2012 that he will retire from NASA and return to private industry.

Career 
Prior to joining NASA, Strain was the head of the Space Department at the Johns Hopkins University Applied Physics Lab in Laurel, MD. Strain joined APL in 2004 as assistant Space Department head for operations. The following year, he was named associate department head and then became the department's managing executive.

He has more than 25 years of experience in the aerospace business, including executive positions at Orbital Sciences, where he led the company's Satellite and Electronic Sensors Divisions; and Fairchild Space and Defense Company, for which he served as chief financial officer and various other operational roles. He attended college at Western Michigan University and received his bachelor's degree in business administration.

In March 2012, Strain joined Ball Aerospace & Technologies as Chief Operating Officer. He served this role for one year, after which he became the President of the company. He has served as President since March 2013.

References

Living people
Goddard Space Flight Center people
Center Directors of NASA
Year of birth missing (living people)
Place of birth missing (living people)
Western Michigan University alumni
American chief executives
American aerospace businesspeople